Gustavo Adrián Lombardi (born 10 September 1975) is an Argentine retired professional footballer who played in Argentina for River Plate, in Spain for UD Salamanca and Deportivo Alavés, and in England for Middlesbrough.

He also played for the Argentina under-20 side at the 1995 FIFA World Youth Championship, as well as for the full Argentina national side.

References

External links
 
 Statistics at FutbolXXI.com  
 Statistics at LFP.es 
 

1975 births
Living people
Footballers from Rosario, Santa Fe
Argentine footballers
Argentina youth international footballers
Argentina under-20 international footballers
Argentina international footballers
Club Atlético River Plate footballers
UD Salamanca players
Middlesbrough F.C. players
Deportivo Alavés players
Argentine Primera División players
La Liga players
Argentine expatriate footballers
Argentine expatriate sportspeople in Spain
Expatriate footballers in Spain
Expatriate footballers in England
Association football defenders